Robert Deane may refer to:

Sir Robert Deane, 5th Baronet (c. 1707–1770), Irish MP for Carysfort and Tallow
Robert Deane, 1st Baron Muskerry (1745–1818), his son, Irish MP for Carysfort and Cork County
Robert Deane, 9th Baron Muskerry (born 1948), Irish peer

See also
Robert Dean (disambiguation)
Robert Deans (disambiguation)